Till Death Us Do Part is a 1968 British comedy film directed by Norman Cohen, written by Johnny Speight, and starring Warren Mitchell and Dandy Nichols. It was based on the BBC television series of the same name. Speight was the creator of the television version. The film was considered successful enough at the box office that a sequel, The Alf Garnett Saga, followed in 1972.

Plot

The film begins in September 1939 shortly before World War II begins. Alf Garnett, a dockyard worker, and his wife Else have been married for only a few weeks, and are already weary of one another. Alf gets called up for military duty but is turned down because he's in a reserved occupation. The film depicts their lives during the London Blitz. Else eventually gets pregnant to Alf and Else's shock, and they have a baby daughter, Rita, in 1942. The war ends in 1945 with a huge street party and Alf, characteristically, gets drunk.
 
Midway through the film it advances from the end of World War II to the 1966 General Election. Rita is now a young woman and engaged to Mike Rawlins, a long-haired layabout from Liverpool. Alf dislikes him because of his support for the Labour Party. Mike and Rita marry in a Catholic church, further angering Alf. At the wedding supper he fights with Mike's family. But Alf and Mike grow a bit closer, attending the 1966 FIFA World Cup Final together.

The film ends in 1968 with the family moving to a new tower block in Essex after their East End neighbourhood street is demolished.

Cast
Warren Mitchell as Alf Garnett
Dandy Nichols as Else Garnett 
Una Stubbs as Rita Rawlins
Antony Booth as Mike Rawlins
Liam Redmond as Mr. Rawlins 
Bill Maynard as Bert 
Brian Blessed as Sergeant
Sam Kydd as Fred 
Frank Thornton as Valuation Officer 
Ann Lancaster as Aunt Maud
Michael Robbins as Pub Landlord 
Pat Coombs as Neighbour 
Kate Williams as Sergeant's Girlfriend 
Shelagh Fraser as Mrs. Rawlins 
John D. Collins as RAF officer at Tube Station 
Geoffrey Hughes as Mike's brother
Tommy Godfrey as Knowledgeable man in pub 
Bob Grant as Man in Pub
Edward Evans as Jim (shopkeeper)

Production
Don Sharp was originally meant to direct but during production had disagreements with Johnny Speight over the script which led to Sharp being fired.

The film had investment from the Robert Stigwood Organisation.

The film went over budget but recovered its cost with a successful theatre run.

Reception

Critical
Time Out wrote, "In its favour, it preserves the original characterisations at something like full strength and doesn't attempt to stitch three weekly episodes together and pass it off as a feature."

Box office
Till Death Us Do Part was the third-most popular film at the UK box office in 1969.

Notes
 The theme tune was composed by Ray Davies of the Kinks. Sung by Chas Mills, it is heard briefly at the end of the film over the closing credits.
 Location footage was filmed in Tower Hamlets.
 The movie operates in a separate continuity to that of the TV series, most notably the Garnetts moving out of Wapping which did not occur in the series or its continuation.

References

External links

1968 films
1968 comedy films
Battle of Britain films
British comedy films
Films based on television series
Films directed by Norman Cohen
British Lion Films films
Films set in 1939
Films set in 1942
Films set in 1966
Films set in 1968
Films set in London
Till Death Us Do Part
1960s English-language films
1960s British films